Lance Palmer (born February 7, 1987) is an American professional mixed martial artist and former collegiate wrestler, who currently competes in the featherweight division. A professional since 2011, he is most notable for competing in Professional Fighters League (PFL), where he was the 2018 and 2019 tournament champion. As a folkstyle wrestler, he was a four-time NCAA Division I All-American and four-time OHSAA state champion.

Wrestling career

High school
Palmer started wrestling at the age of nine and won every OHSAA (state) tournament since his freshman year of high school, making him a four-time Ohio champion out of St. Edward High School. He graduated with a record of 150-6 and also won a  NHSCA Senior National championship while coached by Greg Urbas.

College
After graduating, he attended Division I powerhouse Ohio State University, where he competed at 149 pounds in all of his 4 seasons.

2006-07
True Freshman: Earned All-American status after placing fourth at the NCAA tournament, becoming the second Buckeye to do so in their first year of competition. He also placed third at the Big Ten Championships, and defeated 3 ranked opponents at the tournament.

2007-08
Sophomore: Became a two-time All-American placing eight at the NCAA championship. At the Big Ten's, he placed sixth and was the fifth seed.

2008-09
Junior: Placed fourth at the NCAA's, making him a three-time All-American. He also placed third at the Big Ten Conference championship.

2009-10
Senior: Palmer had the most success in his college career as he became the NCAA's tournament runner-up and champion of the Big Ten Conference before graduating.

Over his career, Palmer compiled a 121–33 record and became a four-time NCAA Division I All-American, one-time NCAA finalist and one-time Big Ten Champion. He defeated notable opponents such as future Olympic Gold Medalist and 2x NCAA Champion Jordan Burroughs, NCAA Champion and future Olympian Frank Molinaro, future NCAA Champion and MMA Fighter Bubba Jenkins, former NCAA Champion (later two-time) Brent Metcalf and University Freestyle National Champion Jason Chamberlain

On June 16, 2020, Palmer was inducted into the Ohio State University's Hall of Fame by his legendary collegiate wrestling career.

Mixed martial arts career

Early career
Palmer made his professional mixed martial arts debut on May 20, 2011. He began his career at 7-0 and won the Resurrection Fighting Alliance Featherweight Championship a little over two years after his debut.

World Series of Fighting
On December 7, 2013, Palmer made his World Series of Fighting debut at WSOF 7 against Bellator veteran Georgi Karakhanyan for the inaugural WSOF Featherweight Championship. He lost via guillotine choke in the third round.

On June 21, 2014, Palmer faced Nick LoBasco at WSOF 10. He won via rear naked choke submission in the first round.

On December 13, 2014, Palmer challenged Rick Glenn for the WSOF Featherweight Championship at WSOF 16. He won via rear naked choke submission in the third round to become the WSOF Featherweight Champion.

On June 5, 2015, Palmer made his first defense of the WSOF Featherweight Championship at WSOF 21 against IFL and WEC veteran Chris Horodecki. He won via neck crank submission in the first round to retain the WSOF Featherweight Championship.

On December 18, 2015, Palmer made the second defense of the WSOF Featherweight Championship at WSOF 26 against Alexandre Almeida. He lost via unanimous decision.

On May 10, 2016, it was announced that Palmer will have a rematch against Alexandre Almeida for the WSOF Featherweight Championship at WSOF 32 on July 30, 2016 in the co-main event. He won via unanimous decision to become a two time WSOF Featherweight Champion.

On June 30, 2016, Palmer fought Andre Harrison in for the first title defense of his second reign as champion at WSOF 35 in the co-main event. He lost the fight via unanimous decision.

Professional Fighters League

After World Series of Fighting became the Professional Fighters League, Palmer next fought on November 2, 2017. He fought Steven Siler at Professional Fighters League: Fight Night where Palmer won the fight via unanimous decision.

Palmer then competed in the inaugural season of the Professional Fighters League. He fought on at the first event of the new format at PFL 1 in the Featherweight division. On June 7, 2018, he faced Bekbulat Magomedov and won the fight by second round submission. On July 19, 2018, Palmer fought Jumabieke Tuerxun at PFL 4. He won the fight by third round submission.

In the fall of 2018, Palmer entered the PFL Featherweight tournament as the second seed. At PFL 8 on October 5, 2018, he defeated Max Coga by unanimous decision in the quarterfinal round and then rematched Andre Harrison and earned unanimous decision win in the semifinal round.

Palmer fought another rematch against Steven Siler in the finals at PFL 11 on December 31, 2018. He won the fight via unanimous decision, winning the PFL Featherweight tournament and earning the $1 million cash prize.

2019 Season
In the opening round of the second season of PFL, Palmer faced Alex Gilpin at PFL 2 on May 23, 2019. He won the fight via unanimous decision, collecting three regular season points.

In the second round Palmer faced Luis Rafael Laurentino at PFL 5 on July 25, 2019. He won the fight via third-round TKO and advanced to the playoffs.

Palmer next faced Alexandre de Almeida and Alex Gilpin at PFL 8 on October 17, 2019. He won both fights by unanimous decision. He was expected to face Daniel Pineda in the Featherweight tournament finals, but after Pineda failed a drug test after PFL 8, Palmer was set to face Alex Gilpin in the finals again.

Palmer and Gilpin faced each other for the third time during the season at PFL 10 on December 31, 2019. Palmer implemented his grappling-heavy fight style, winning the bout via unanimous decision and claiming his second PFL Featherweight tournament victory.

2021 Season
Palmer was scheduled to face Jason Soares in the opening round of the third season on May 21, 2020. However, the event was cancelled due to the COVID-19 pandemic.

Palmer faced 2011 NCAA Division I champion Bubba Jenkins on April 23, 2021 at PFL 1. He lost for the first time during his PFL run via unanimous decision.

Palmer was scheduled to face Lazar Stojadinovic at PFL 4 on June 10, 2021. However, on May 24, it was announced that Stojadinovic had to pull out of the bout and was replaced by Jesse Stirn. A day before the event, Palmer was pulled and rescheduled to face Movlid Khaybulaev on June 25, 2021 at PFL 6. He lost the bout via unanimous decision, eliminating Palmer from the playoffs for the first time in his PFL career.

2022 Season 
Palmer faced Chris Wade on April 28, 2022 at PFL 2. He lost the bout via unanimous decision.

Palmer faced Sheymon Moraes on June 24, 2022 at PFL 5. He won the bout via unanimous decision.

Personal life
Palmer was an assistant wrestling coach at the Virginia Tech program.

Palmer’s high school career was documented in the movie "Pinned."

Palmer and his fiancée Jessie have a daughter, Maya (born 2021).

Championships and accomplishments

Mixed Martial Arts
Professional Fighters League
2018 PFL Featherweight Championship
2019 PFL Featherweight Championship
Resurrection Fighting Alliance
RFA Featherweight Championship (One time)
World Series of Fighting
WSOF Featherweight Championship (Two times)
One Successful Title Defense

Folkstyle Wrestling

Collegiate 
National Collegiate Athletic Association
 Ohio State University Hall of Fame Inductee (2020)
NCAA Division I All-American out of Ohio State University (2007, 2008, 2009, 2010)
NCAA Division I 149 lbs - 4th place out of Ohio State University (2007)
NCAA Division I 149 lbs - 8th place out of Ohio State University (2008)
NCAA Division I 149 lbs - 4th place out of Ohio State University (2009)
NCAA Division I 149 lbs - 2nd place out of Ohio State University (2010)
Big Ten Conference
B1G 149 lbs - 3rd place out of Ohio State University (2007)
B1G 149 lbs - 6th place out of Ohio State University (2008)
B1G 149 lbs - 3rd place out of Ohio State University (2009)
B1G 149 lbs - 1st place out of Ohio State University (2010)

High school 
Ohio High School Athletic Association
OHSAA 103 lb Division I State Champion out of St. Edward High School (2003)
OHSAA 112 lb Division I State Champion out of St. Edward High School (2004)
OHSAA 125 lb Division I State Champion out of St. Edward High School (2005)
OHSAA 140 lb Division I State Champion out of St. Edward High School (2006)

Mixed martial arts record

|-
|Win
|align=center|23–6
|Sheymon Moraes
|Decision (unanimous)
|PFL 5
|
|align=center|3
|align=center|5:00
|Atlanta, Georgia, United States
|
|-
|Loss
|align=center|22–6
|Chris Wade
|Decision (unanimous)
|PFL 2
|
|align=center|3
|align=center|5:00
|Arlington, Texas, United States
|
|-
|Loss
|align=center|22–5
|Movlid Khaybulaev
|Decision (unanimous)
|PFL 6
|
|align=center|3
|align=center|5:00
|Atlantic City, New Jersey, United States
|
|-
|Loss
|align=center|22–4
|Bubba Jenkins
|Decision (unanimous)
|PFL 1 
|
|align=center|3
|align=center|5:00
|Atlantic City, New Jersey, United States
|
|-
|Win
|align=center|22–3
|Alex Gilpin	
|Decision (unanimous)
|PFL 10
|
|align=center|5
|align=center|5:00
|New York City, New York, United States
|
|-
|Win
|align=center|21–3
|Alex Gilpin
|Decision (unanimous)
|rowspan=2 | PFL 8
|rowspan=2 | 
|align=center| 3
|align=center| 5:00
|rowspan=2 | Las Vegas, Nevada, United States
|
|-
|Win
|align=center|20–3
|Alexandre Almeida
|Decision (unanimous)
|align=center| 2
|align=center| 5:00
|
|-
|Win
|align=center|19–3
|Luis Rafael Laurentino
|TKO (punches)
|PFL 5
|
|align=center|3
|align=center|2:45
|Atlantic City, New Jersey, United States 
|
|-
|Win
|align=center|18–3
|Alex Gilpin
|Decision (unanimous)
|PFL 2
|
|align=center|3
|align=center|5:00
|Uniondale, New York, United States 
|
|-
|Win
|align=center|17–3
|Steven Siler
|Decision (unanimous)
|PFL 11
|
|align=center|5
|align=center|5:00
|New York City, New York, United States 
|
|-
|Win
|align=center|16–3
|Andre Harrison
|Decision (unanimous)
|rowspan=2|PFL 8
|rowspan=2|
|align=center|3
|align=center|5:00
| rowspan=2|New Orleans, Louisiana, United States
|
|-
|Win
|align=center|15–3
|Max Coga
|Decision (unanimous)
|align=center|2
|align=center|5:00
|
|-
|Win
|align=center|14–3
|Jumabieke Tuerxun
|Submission (rear-naked choke)
|PFL 4
|
|align=center| 3
|align=center| 4:34
|Uniondale, New York, United States 
| 
|-
|Win
|align=center|13–3
|Bekbulat Magomedov
|Submission (rear-naked choke)
|PFL 1
|
|align=center|2
|align=center|3:21
|New York City, New York, United States 
|
|-
|Win
|align=center|12–3
|Steven Siler
|Decision (unanimous)
|Professional Fighters League: Fight Night
|
|align=center|3
|align=center|5:00
|Washington, D.C., United States
| 
|-
|Loss
|align=center| 11–3
|Andre Harrison
|Decision (unanimous)
|WSOF 35
|
|align=center|5
|align=center|5:00
|Verona, New York, United States
|
|-
|Win
|align=center| 11–2
|Alexandre Almeida
|Decision (majority)
|WSOF 32
|
|align=center|5
|align=center|5:00
|Everett, Washington, United States
|
|-
|Loss
|align=center| 10–2
|Alexandre Almeida
|Decision (unanimous)
|WSOF 26
|
|align=center|5
|align=center|5:00
|Las Vegas, Nevada, United States
|
|- 
|Win
|align=center| 10–1
|Chris Horodecki
|Submission (neck crank)
|WSOF 21
|
|align=center|1
|align=center|4:28
|Edmonton, Alberta, Canada
|
|-
|Win
|align=center| 9–1
|Rick Glenn
|Submission (rear naked choke)
|WSOF 16
|
|align=center|3
|align=center|3:09
|Sacramento, California, United States
|
|-
|Win
|align=center| 8–1
|Nick LoBosco
|Submission (rear naked choke)
|WSOF 10
|
|align=center|1
|align=center|4:15
|Las Vegas, Nevada, United States
|
|-
|Loss
|align=center| 7–1
|Georgi Karakhanyan
|Submission (guillotine choke)
|WSOF 7
|
|align=center|3
|align=center|4:40
|Vancouver, British Columbia, Canada
|
|-
|Win
|align=center| 7–0
|Jared Downing
|Decision (split)
|RFA 8: Pettis vs. Pegg
|
|align=center|5
|align=center|5:00
|Milwaukee, Wisconsin, United States
|
|-
|Win
|align=center| 6–0
|Patrick Reeves
|Submission (guillotine choke)
|Showdown Fights 11: Buchholz vs. Bell
|
|align=center|1
|align=center|3:40
|Orem, Utah, United States
|
|-
|Win
|align=center| 5–0
|Fredson Paixao
|Decision (split)
|RFA 4: Griffin vs. Escudero
|
|align=center|3
|align=center|5:00
|Las Vegas, Nevada, United States
|
|-
|Win
|align=center| 4–0
|Joe Washington
|Decision (unanimous)
|UVC 20: Clash at the Coliseum
|
|align=center|3
|align=center|5:00
|Columbus, Ohio, United States
|
|-
|Win
|align=center| 3–0
|Jordan Chandler
|Submission (arm triangle choke)
|Showdown Fights 6: Breakout
|
|align=center|2
|align=center|4:07
|Orem, Utah, United States
|
|-
|Win
|align=center| 2–0
|Chris David
|Decision (unanimous)
|Fight For Wrestling 4
|
|align=center|3
|align=center|5:00
|San Luis Obispo, California, United States
|
|-
|Win
|align=center| 1–0
|Emilio Gonzales
|Submission (rear naked choke)
|Fight For Wrestling 3: Back in Bakersfield
|
|align=center|1
|align=center|2:22
|Bakersfield, California, United States
|

NCAA record 

! colspan="8"| NCAA Championships Matches
|-
!  Res.
!  Record
!  Opponent
!  Score
!  Date
!  Event
|-
! style=background:white colspan=6 |2010 NCAA Championships  at 149 lbs
|-
|Loss
|15-7
|align=left|Brent Metcalf
|style="font-size:88%"|2-3
|style="font-size:88%" rowspan=5|March 20, 2010
|style="font-size:88%" rowspan=5|2010 NCAA Division I Wrestling Championships
|-
|Win
|15-6
|align=left|Frank Molinaro
|style="font-size:88%"|2-0
|-
|Win
|14-6
|align=left|Jason Chamberlain
|style="font-size:88%"|Fall
|-
|Win
|13-6
|align=left|Nick Bertucci
|style="font-size:88%"|Fall
|-
|Win
|12-6
|align=left|Seth Morton
|style="font-size:88%"|8-1
|-
! style=background:white colspan=6 |2009 NCAA Championships 4th at 149 lbs
|-
|Win
|11-6
|align=left|Jake Patacsil
|style="font-size:88%"|8-7
|style="font-size:88%" rowspan=5|March 21, 2009
|style="font-size:88%" rowspan=5|2009 NCAA Division I Wrestling Championships
|-
|Loss
|10-5
|align=left|Brent Metcalf
|style="font-size:88%"|2-6
|-
|Win
|10-4
|align=left|Kyle Ruschell
|style="font-size:88%"|4-0
|-
|Win
|9-4
|align=left|Mitch Mueller
|style="font-size:88%"|3-0
|-
|Win
|8-4
|align=left|Matt Cathell
|style="font-size:88%"|4-3
|-
! style=background:white colspan=6 |2008 NCAA Championships 8th at 149 lbs
|-
|Loss
|7-4
|align=left|Dustin Schlatter
|style="font-size:88%"|2-3
|style="font-size:88%" rowspan=6|March 22, 2008
|style="font-size:88%" rowspan=6|2008 NCAA Division I Wrestling Championships
|-
|Loss
|7-3
|align=left|Josh Churella
|style="font-size:88%"|2-6
|-
|Win
|7-2
|align=left|Brandon Carter
|style="font-size:88%"|MD 11-3
|-
|Loss
|6-2
|align=left|Brent Metcalf
|style="font-size:88%"|2-3
|-
|Win
|6-1
|align=left|Jake Patacsil
|style="font-size:88%"|MD 14-6
|-
|Win
|5-1
|align=left|Kyle Larson
|style="font-size:88%"|MD 14-3
|-
! style=background:white colspan=6 |2007 NCAA Championships 4th at 149 lbs
|-
|Win
|4-1
|align=left|Tyler Turner
|style="font-size:88%"|OT 6-5
|style="font-size:88%" rowspan=5|March 17, 2007
|style="font-size:88%" rowspan=5|2007 NCAA Division I Wrestling Championships
|-
|Loss
|3-1
|align=left|Josh Churella
|style="font-size:88%"|2-5
|-
|Win
|3-0
|align=left|Matt Coughlin
|style="font-size:88%"|2-1
|-
|Win
|2-0
|align=left|Scott Ervin
|style="font-size:88%"|10-3
|-
|Win
|1-0
|align=left|John Cox
|style="font-size:88%"|MD 10-2
|-

See also
 List of male mixed martial artists

References

External links
 Lance Palmer at PFL
 
 
 

American male mixed martial artists
Mixed martial artists from Ohio
Featherweight mixed martial artists
Mixed martial artists utilizing collegiate wrestling
Mixed martial artists utilizing Brazilian jiu-jitsu
Living people
St. Edward High School (Lakewood, Ohio) alumni
American male sport wrestlers
American practitioners of Brazilian jiu-jitsu
1988 births